

References

P